The Ft. Lauderdale A1A marathon and Half Marathon began in 2006 when it was founded by Steve Tebon and Exclusive Sports Marketing.  Since then, it has grown to field more than 4,500 participants from over 40 US states and 12 countries to become one of the premier events in the state of Florida. The race is currently a Boston qualifier.

The inaugural marathon, run on February 19, 2006, featured 332 runners, and was won by local Miami resident, Gabriel Rodriguez, in 2:39:05.

List of winners

Marathon

Half marathon

See also
List of marathon races in North America

References

External links
Official website

Marathons in the United States
Recurring sporting events established in 2006
Marathon
2006 establishments in Florida